Bnei Darom (lit. Sons of the South) is a religious moshav shitufi in central Israel. Located near the Mediterranean coast, it falls under the jurisdiction of Hevel Yavne Regional Council.

History
Bnei Darom was established in 1949 by members of the gar'in group Netivot Kfar Darom who had been forced out of Kibbutz Kfar Darom in the Gaza Strip when it was occupied by the Egyptian Army during the 1948 Arab–Israeli War. They were joined by another gar'in group, Morasha from the United States, though most of its members were not prepared for the kibbutz-style life in a moshav shitufi and left, some of them to form Beit Hazon. Originally affiliated with Hapoel HaMizrachi, it joined the Religious Kibbutz Movement as a moshav shitufi in 2007.

According to Walid Khalidi, Bnei Darom was founded on land belonging to Isdud. However, according to Andrew Petersen, it was on land belonging to the depopulated Palestinian village of Arab Suqrir, with the remains of a khan located in a wooded park next to the modern water tower. The khan ruins were first described by Victor Guérin, who inspected them in 1863, and who wrote the following description:This ruin is that of a Khan, now overthrown. It is 60 paces long by 37 broad.  It contains a cistern and a small vaulted magazine, as yet not destroyed. Below the hillock covered by its ruins I remarked on the east a reservoir and viaduct, a well partly fallen in, but well built. A canal, traces of which are alone visible, carried the water of the reservoir to a fountain, now demolished, and situated in the plain near the roadGuérin, 1869, pp.79 - 80, as given in translation by Conder and Kitchener, 1882, SWP II, pp.425 -  426
Clermont-Ganneau visited the place in 1873, and gave a very similar description, with the addition: "this must have been the site of some ancient  "manzel", or posting-house, on the Arab route from Syria to Egypt.

The site was registered as "an ancient monument" during the Mandate era, although the owners were permitted to build a reservoir 20m square within the khan.

Petersen, inspecting the place in 1994, found the place in much the same condition as during the Mandate period, except that the reservoir from the Mandate time had been now replaced with a water-tower. Petersen described the remains as comprising a nearly 40m long wall, running north-south, with an entrance near the north end. A barrel-vaulted chamber, with an interior measuring 8.3m long and 3.8m wide, is located inside the khan, just south of the entrance.

In 2002 excavations in the moshav found major remains from the Mamluk period.

References

Bibliography

    (pp. 126-127 )

External links
Official website 

Moshavim
Populated places established in 1949
Populated places in Central District (Israel)
1949 establishments in Israel